Kim Chi-woo (born 11 November 1983) is a South Korean former footballer who played as a left-back.

Club career

Incheon United
After attending Chung-Ang University, Kim joined newly formed K League club Incheon United in 2004. He made 17 league appearances in his debut season. Over his three years at Incheon, Kim played 52 games in the K League. He left the club after the 2006 season.

Loan to Partizan
In January 2005, Kim joined Partizan on an 18-month loan deal, receiving the number 13 shirt. He made eight league appearances until the end of the season, helping the club win the championship title with an unbeaten record.

Jeonnam Dragons
From 2007 to 2008, Kim played for Jeonnam Dragons in the K League, making 37 appearances and scoring two goals.

FC Seoul
Between 2008 and 2017, Kim spent eight and a half seasons with FC Seoul, totaling over 200 official appearances. He helped the club win three K League titles (2010, 2012, and 2016), one Korean FA Cup (2015) and one Korean League Cup (2010).

Loan to Sangju Sangmu Phoenix
In 2011, Kim was loaned to Sangju Sangmu Phoenix, staying with the club for one and a half years.

Busan IPark
In 2018, Kim signed with K League 2 club Busan IPark. He helped them win promotion to the top flight in the 2019 season.

International career

Youth
At youth level, Kim represented South Korea in the 2003 FIFA World Youth Championship, as the team reached the knockout stage. He was also capped for the national under-23 team at the 2006 Asian Games, as South Korea lost in the bronze-medal match.

Senior
Between 2006 and 2013, Kim was capped 29 times for South Korea at full level, scoring five goals. He was a member of the team at the 2007 AFC Asian Cup.

Career statistics

Club

International

International goals
Scores and results list South Korea's goal tally first.

Honours
Partizan
 First League of Serbia and Montenegro: 2004–05
Jeonnam Dragons
 Korean FA Cup: 2007
FC Seoul
 K-League / K League Classic: 2010, 2012, 2016
 Korean FA Cup: 2015
 Korean League Cup: 2010

References

External links
 
 

1983 births
Living people
Footballers from Seoul
South Korean footballers
Association football defenders
South Korea youth international footballers
South Korea international footballers
Asian Games competitors for South Korea
Footballers at the 2006 Asian Games
2007 AFC Asian Cup players
Incheon United FC players
FK Partizan players
Jeonnam Dragons players
FC Seoul players
Gimcheon Sangmu FC players
Busan IPark players
K League 1 players
First League of Serbia and Montenegro players
K League 2 players
South Korean expatriate footballers
Expatriate footballers in Serbia and Montenegro
South Korean expatriate sportspeople in Serbia and Montenegro